The Changan UNI-V is a compact car produced by Chinese auto manufacturer Changan.

Overview

The Changan UNI-V is the third product of the UNI-series, and also the first sedan of the series. It was first unveiled to the public during the 2021 Guangzhou Auto Show.
The Changan UNI-V was developed on the new lightweight Modular Platform Architecture, also called as Ark Architecture. The platform is the base of the highly rigid and lightweight body of the UNI-V according to Changan Automobile.

Powertrain

Interior
The interior design of the UNI-V adopts a 3+1 quadruple screen layout design. The hovering instrument panel is placed above the steering wheel, displaying high-frequency interactive information such as speed and navigation from the instrument panel with a 10° eye movement when looking at the road ahead.

References

Cars introduced in 2021
Sedans
Cars of China